Nagórnik may refer to the following places in Poland:
Nagórnik, Lower Silesian Voivodeship (south-west Poland)
Nagórnik, Masovian Voivodeship (east-central Poland)